Dobra  is a village in the administrative district of Gmina Stryków, within Zgierz County, Łódź Voivodeship, in central Poland.

The village has a population of 510 (2008).

The Battle of Dobra took place in the village during the January Uprising.

References

Villages in Zgierz County
Kalisz Governorate
Poznań Voivodeship (1921–1939)